WUFF may refer to:

 WUFF (AM), a radio station (710 AM) licensed to Eastman, Georgia, United States
 WUFF-FM, a radio station (97.5 FM) licensed to Eastman, Georgia, United States